A mobility aid is a device designed to assist walking or otherwise improve the mobility of people with a mobility impairment.

There are various walking aids which can help people with impaired ability to walk, and wheelchairs or mobility scooters for more severe disability or longer journeys which would otherwise be undertaken on foot. For people who are blind or visually impaired the white cane and guide dog have a long history of use. Other aids can help with mobility or transfer within a building or where there are changes of level.

Traditionally the phrase "mobility aid" has applied mainly to low technology mechanical devices. The term also appears in government documents, for example dealing with tax concessions of various kinds. It refers to those devices whose use enables a freedom of movement similar to that of unassisted walking or standing up from a chair.

Technical advances can be expected to increase the scope of these devices considerably, for example by use of sensors and audio or tactile feedback.

Walking aids

Walking aids include assistive canes (commonly referred to as walking sticks), crutches, and walkers. As appropriate to the needs of the individual user, these devices help to maintain upright ambulation by providing any or all of: improved stability, reduced lower-limb loading and generating movement.
Improved stability By providing additional points of contact the walking aid provides both additional support and a wider range of stable centre of gravity positioning.
Reduced lower-limb loading By directing load through the arms and the walking aid, lower impact and static forces are transmitted through the affected limbs.
Generating Movement The walking aid and arms can substitute for the muscles and joints of the spine, pelvis and/or legs in the generation of dynamic forces during walking.

Cane
The cane or walking stick is the simplest form of walking aid. It is held in the hand and transmits loads to the floor through a shaft. The load which can be applied through a cane is transmitted through the user's hands and wrists and limited by these.

Crutches
A crutch also transmits loads to the ground through a shaft, but has two points of contact with the arm, at the hand and either below the elbow or below the armpit. This allows significantly greater loads to be exerted through a crutch in comparison with a cane.

Canes, crutches, and forearm crutch combinations
Devices on the market today include a number of combinations for canes, crutches, and forearm crutches. These crutches have bands that encircle the forearms and handles for the patient to hold and rest their hands on to support the body weight. The forearm crutch typically gives a user the support of the cane but with additional forearm support to assist in mobility. The forearm portion helps increase balance, lateral stability and also reduces the load on the wrist.

Walkers
A walker (also known as a Zimmer frame) is the most stable walking aid and consists of a freestanding metal framework with three or more points of contact which the user places in front of them and then grips during movement. The points of contact may be either fixed rubber ferrules as with crutches and canes, or wheels, or a combination of both. Wheeled walkers are also known as rollators. Many of these walkers also come with an inbuilt seat so that the user may rest during use and with metal pouches to carry personal belongings.

Walker cane hybrid

A walker cane hybrid was introduced in 2012 designed to bridge the gap between a cane and a walker. The hybrid has two legs which provide lateral (side-to-side) support which a cane does not. It can be used with two hands in front of the user, similar to a walker, and provides an increased level of support compared with a cane. It can be adjusted for use with either one or two hands, at the front and at the side, as well as a stair climbing assistant. The hybrid is not designed to replace a walker which normally has four legs and provides 4-way support using both hands.

Gait trainers
Another device to assist walking that has entered the market in recent years is the gait trainer. This is a mobility aid that is more supportive than the standard walker. It typically offers support that assists weight-bearing and balance. The accessories or product parts that attach to the product frame provide unweighting support and postural alignment to enable walking practice.

Seated walking scooter

The Walk Aid Scooter allows a user with normal balance and foot, knee or hip conditions to unload the lower extremities. The two-wheeled scooter has a bicycle-type seat and handlebars, and is manually propelled with one or both feet like a balance bicycle. This walking aid scooter provides more support than a cane and is lighter, less bulky and easier to propel than a wheelchair.

Wheelchairs and scooters
Wheelchairs and mobility scooters substitute for walking by providing a wheeled device on which the user sits. Wheelchairs may be either manually propelled (by the user or by an aide) or electrically powered (commonly known as a "powerchair"). There are different types of wheelchair power add-ons that turn any manual wheelchair into a power assisted. 
Mobility scooters are electrically powered, as are motorized wheelchairs.
Wheelchairs and Scooters are normally recommended for any individual due to significant mobility/balance impairment. A Registered Occupational Therapist or Physiotherapist (few cases) are able to provide object and clinical testing to ensure proper and safe device recommendations.

Stairlifts and similar devices
A stairlift is a mechanical device for lifting people and wheelchairs up and down stairs. Sometimes special purpose lifts are provided elsewhere to facilitate access for those with disabilities, for example at entrances to raised bus stops in Curitiba, Brazil. A wheelchair lift is specifically designed to carry the user and the wheelchair. This can either be through floor or utilizing the staircase.

Others

Mobility aids may also include adaptive technology such as sling lifts or other patient transfer devices that help transfer users between beds and chairs or lift chairs (and other sit-to-stand devices), transfer or convertible chairs. Knee scooters help some users. As people start to live longer mobility is about for many reclaiming aspects of independence which before were denied to them.

See also
Accessibility
Handcycle
Hobcart
Recumbent bicycle
Transport divide
Animal locomotion — at a biological level, there are many different ways to get around

References

Michael W. Whittle, R (2008). "Pathological and Other Abnormal gaits", Gait Analysis, An Introduction, Butterworth Heinemann & Elsevier, (122-130).

External links
 
Assistive Devices and Mobility Aids: Travelers with Disabilities and Medical Conditions Regulations for travelers from the US Transportation Security Administration

 Mobility device
Accessibility